Tom Caplen (23 November 1879 – 17 April 1945) was an English cricketer who played for Kent County Cricket Club and Cornwall County Cricket Club. He was a right-handed batsman and a right-arm fast bowler.

Caplen was born in Rusthall near Tunbridge Wells in Kent in 1879. He made his only first-class cricket appearance for Kent during the 1897 season aged seventeen. He made at least three appearances for the Kent Second XI, the first in August 1895, when he was aged 15.

Caplen played for Cornwall In 1898 and 1900, making one Minor Counties Championship appearance and in 1902 he played for the Madras Presidency against the Oxford University Authentics. He died at Hove in Sussex in 1945 aged 65.

References

External links

1879 births
1945 deaths
English cricketers
Kent cricketers
Cornwall cricketers